Hari Hari Churiyaan is a Pakistani drama serial written by Jahanzeb Qamar and directed by Waada fame director Syed Atif Hussain. It stars Aiman Khan, Hassan Ahmed and Wahaj Ali in lead. The drama was first aired 1 August 2017 on Geo Entertainment, where it aired every Tuesday at 8:00 P.M.

Plot
Cousins Aiman and Ali have found comfort in staying as silent lovers. The sweet love birds have never been expressive but they have never been worried either. Aiman is very fond of bangles, especially green colors one, and Ali always brings those bangles for her. However, he also realizes the need of a stable career as he does not come with a strong financial background.

When Ali’s parents send a marriage proposal for Aiman, her grandmother intervenes and orders that Aiman should rather be married off to her other cousin, Waqar. Someone who lives with his wealthy family in Canada and whose father sends money to Aiman’s grandmother on a monthly basis.

The fact that their relationship was built on doubts rather than trusts, 
Aiman puts her feelings aside with a heavy heart and ties the knot with Waqar. The man she marries looks sensible from his appearance but has happens to have his own toxic traits. Somehow fate brings Ali back in Aiman’s life and Waqar starts doubting her integrity and tortures her physically.

Cast
Aiman Khan as Aiman
Wahaj Ali as Ali
Hassan Ahmed as Waqar
Sajid Hassan as Fasahat
Mehmood Aslam as Shujat (Aiman's father)
Shagufta Ejaz as Surraya (Aiman's mother)
Natasha Ali as Zunaira
Mariya Khan as Nausheen
Javeria Abbasi as Sheeza
Hina Rizvi as Guddi
Qaiser Naqvi as Guddi's mother
Hardy Firdousi as Gul Khan
Rabia Tabbassum as Bilqees
Nazli Nasr as Saleema
Faria Sheikh as Maheen
Asad Siddiqui as Kashan
Naushaba Bashir as Najma
Fauzia Mushtaq as Shehnaz (Ali's grandmother)
Ali Deswali as Faraz
Ali Butt as Zai 
Sharmeen Tayyab as Guddi Baji
Khalid Butt as Hashim
Sabahat Ali Bukhari as Salma

References

2017 establishments in Pakistan
Pakistani television series